Christmas Eve Procession is one of the main characteristic manifestations of the Maltese Christmas celebrations. It origins is from over 86 years ago by St. George Preca (1880-1962). He had no pretensions of instituting something on a large scale. His only intention was to instill a truly Christian spirit in commemorating the birth of Christ.

Overview

For St. George Preca (Dun Ġorġ) Christmas meant so much, even on a personal level. His mother was Natalina née Ceravolo, a name which brought him so many sweet memories, especially after her death in 1915. At the baptism on 17 February 1880, he was also given the name Emmanuel (meaning "Lord is with us"). Christmas then, took another great significant in his life after 1906. Following a heart-breaking illness, with a very little hope of survival, Dun Ġorġ was ordained on 22 December 1906, and on Christmas Day he celebrated his first solemn Mass at St. Cajetan parish church in Ħamrun, Malta.

The birth of Christ and the Mystery of the Incarnation of the Son of God were frequent topics of his long meditations and prayer. When he started the Society of Christian Doctrine (MUSEUM) in 1907, Dun Ġorġ used to talk at length and explain the prologue to the Gospel of St. John, especially verse 14: Et Verbum caro factum est et habitavit in nobis ("The Word was made flesh and lived among us"). He gave so much important to these words that he later chose them as the society's motto; and in 1918, they were incorporated in the society's badge which every member wore on his lapel.

Dun Ġorġ even asked members to say special prayers on the 25th of each month to thank God for the birth of Christ. He also wrote a series of reflections, in the form of a dialogue between an angel and the congregation on a number of virtues as reflected by Baby Jesus in the manger. He named these reflections L-Iskola ta' Betlem (The School of Betlehem), and these were to be read during the nine days preceding Christmas. Later he even recommended members to walk in procession with the statue of Baby Jesus from the chapel of the centre to each catechism class. He even encouraged members to give the children attending the centre a small crib with the figures of Baby Jesus, Mary and Joseph, to ensure that families have a crib at home - this was already the case in the first two decades of the 20th century.

Dun Ġorġ often went to the MUSEUM's Marsa centre on Saturday afternoons and spent hours hearing confessions. On 25 December 1920, seeing that the members and boys were so enthusiastic about the usual monthly procession, he called the superior, Salvino Cordina, and told him that he would like the usual indoor procession to proceed outside the centre through the neighbouring streets, with Christmas hymns were sung.

As one of the members carried the statuette of Baby Jesus on a white linen cloth, the group want out along Nazarene Street, and Zerafa Street in Marsa to Blata l-Bajda, turned into High Street, Ħamrun, and back to the centre. Dun Ġorġ was elated when told how the people enthusiastically received this first manifestation.

The following year, in mid-December 1921, during the usual weekly meeting with members at the Ħamrun centre, Dun Ġorġ told his followers he wanted to organise a "demonstration" with the statue of Baby Jesus through the town's streets "in honour of our Saviour, Jesus Christ".

One member stood up and asked Dun Gorg if his suggestion meant taking to the streets shouting slogans about Christ and His birth. Most probably this member was Salvu Muscat (1885-1960), then superior of the Blata l-Bajda centre and one of the few founding members of the MUSEUM. At this time, the word "demonstration" (dimostrazzjoni) meant a protest march for more civil rights and better working conditions, and members were surprised to hear this word from Dun Gorg, who was widely known as a very peaceful and timid priest. But this was far from what the founder had in mind.

Dun Gorg put their minds at rest and explained that all he wanted was a manifestation of faith in the Mystery of the Incarnation and a joyous expression of Christmas. He realised that secular ideas and traditions which did not reflect the true meaning of Christmas were slowly finding their way in the celebration of this feast.

At the time, for ordinary people, Christmas meant attending Midnight Mass, preparing a good meal and enjoying homemade pastries and honey rings (mqaret tat-tamal and qaghaq ta' l-ghasel). Children were happy to play with nuts and chestnuts while their fathers filled wine-shops enjoying some good wine. A few others went round the village playing the bagpipe, the tambourine and the flute.

Some days after the meeting, Dun Gorg told the members to organise the Christmas Eve procession. The three MUSEUM centres of Marsa, Blata l-Bajda and Hamrun began to form choirs but they found it difficult to obtain a large figure of Baby Jesus for the occasion. Such statues were only seen in churches.

However, the Franciscan Conventuals in Kingsway (now Republic Street), Valletta, came to the rescue and agreed to lend them a statue of Baby Jesus on Christmas Eve.

Just before sunset on Christmas Eve 1921, all adult and junior members from the centres of Marsa, Blata l-Bajda and Hamrun began to assemble at 6, Fra Diegu Street, Hamrun, where 14 years earlier Dun Gorg has started his Society of Christian Doctrine. Some came along with lanterns like those used by altar boys accompanying the Viaticum, other brought their father's bicycle headlamp lit by acetylene gas, others carried paraffin hurricane lamps and even candle-lit lanterns used by farmers on their carts; younger children brought coloured paper lamps and Venetian lights. Some even carried palm fronds and olive branches while others improvised lanterns made of hewn small pumpkins lit by candle.

As soon as the statue of Baby Jesus, carried on a white linen cloth in the arms of an adult member, appeared on the doorstep of the centre, all started singing carols Nini la Tibkix Iżjed and the Adeste Fideles. From Fra Diegu Street, the procession made its way through the streets of Ħamrun. The singing of hymns aroused the curiosity of the people inside their homes who opened their windows or looked from behind their balconies to share the event with those taking part. Everybody enjoyed it and many expressed their wish to have it repeated the following year.

Encouraged by what happened at Ħamrun, the following year some of 19 branches started organising similar processions. Gerald Schembri of Żabbar, then aged nine, recalls how in 1922, dressed as an altar boy, he carried Baby Jesus on a white linen cloth in his arms during the first procession in the town. The streets were almost in total darkness, not yet surfaced, muddy, with potholes turned into pools after a downpour. Boys brought candles and all sorts of lanterns including those used by farmers and fishermen on their boats. A teenage named Joseph Chetcuti held a bicycle headlamp lit by acetylene gas to serve as a spotlight on the improvised cradle with Baby Jesus.

Christmas carols and hymns were sung, and the residents looked out of their windows to watch their procession. The same story was soon to repeated in Qormi (1921), Birgu (1923), Valletta (1924), and later Żebbuġ, Siġġiewi, Gudja and Żejtun.

Acquiring an almost life-size statue of Baby Jesus continued to be a probleme. In 1923, however, Ġiġi Vidal from Birgu branch took the initiative of importing one from Lecce, Italy. Soon, other branches were eager to have a similar statue. Aware of the demand, a Valletta importer soon brought 12 similar Baby Jesus (bambini) from Lecce. On hearing of their arrival, the Siġġiewi Branch superior, Karmenu Bonnici, "prepared his donkey and went straight to Valletta seafront and bought one for 30 scudi (Lm2.50c), which was equivalent to a month's wage of a normal labourer". Soon, the remaining statues were bought by other MUSEUM Branches. Some of these bambini are still used today. It is believed that the Qormi statue of Baby Jesus was modelled by Fr. Francis Micallef who had lent out the one for the first Ħamrun procession of 1921.

Many members of the society used their skills to make this event even more attractive and devotional. The Qormi superior, Antonio Cassar, a tinsmith, hammered out a beautiful halo, two flower vases complete with metal flowers and leaves mounted on a portable platform. Other professional carpenters made beautiful inlaid mangers and platforms for the procession.

John Gerada (1889-1964), a member from Żabbar, produced very fine and beautiful wax bambini of various sizes. He also made papier-mache statues for other MUSEUM branches for use in processions.

Soon, acetylene gas lighting was introduced during the procession. Double sided plywood placards with biblical quotations formed by perforated letters covered with coloured tissue paper were added in later years. These shield-shaped placards, designed by Ġużè Schembri, general secretary of the society, are still known as skudi (shields). Mantel lamps and now camp gas replaced the acetylene burners. Today electricity, through the use of batteries and public address systems, makes the event more enjoyable and meaningful.

Since the 1930s, the choir was accompanied by up to three members playing the accordion. In some villages, the tambourine, the triangle and the traditional dorga (a small earthenware pitcher, like a cruet, having a spout with a slot, similar to whistle) were played instead. When the dorga was filled with water and blown into, it produced a pleasant warbling note. In recent years, some volunteers form a small band and accompany the singing hymns as Dun Ġorġ had made it clear that no formal band was to take part.

The procession used to make a stop, usually at the village square (pjazza) where one of the boys would deliver a short sermon on the Nativity. In 1945, two boys, representing two Bethlehem

References

Maltese culture
Christmas and holiday season parades